Boneville is an unincorporated community in McDuffie County, Georgia, United States. Boneville has a post office with ZIP code 30806, which opened on September 15, 1884.

References

Unincorporated communities in McDuffie County, Georgia
Unincorporated communities in Georgia (U.S. state)